Louis Norman (born 18 December 1993) is a British professional boxer who held the English flyweight title from 2013 to 2015. He also challenged for the British flyweight and English super-flyweight titles in 2016 and the English bantamweight title in 2018.

Career
Born in Leicestershire and based in Shepshed, after fighting as an amateur out of Shepshed Amateur Boxing Club, Norman made his professional debut in April 2012, with a points win over Delroy Spencer. After winning his first five fights, including a win over Mohammed Waqas to take the British masters flyweight title, he faced Nathan Reeve in December 2013 for the vacant English flyweight title, winning by unanimous decision. He defended the title in May 2014 against Don Broadhurst, the fight ending a draw, and lost it in September 2015 when he was outpointed by Charlie Edwards on the undercard of Anthony Joshua vs. Gary Cornish. In 2014, he was named Best Young Boxer at the Midlands Boxing Awards.

In May 2016, Norman faced Andrew Selby for the vacant British flyweight title, losing by unanimous decision after struggling to make the weight. He moved up to super flyweight in October 2016 to face Broadhurst for the vacant English title, losing via a split decision. He fought Thomas Essomba for the vacant English bantamweight title in March 2018 but lost to a knockout from a body shot in the 6th round.

Professional boxing record

References

External links

1993 births
Living people
English male boxers
Flyweight boxers
Super-flyweight boxers
People from Shepshed
Sportspeople from Leicestershire